Julio Augusto Dabo (born 13 March 2004) is a Bissau-Guinean professional footballer who plays as a left-back for the Portuguese club Braga.

Professional career
Born in Guinea-Bissau, Dabo moved to Portugal at a young age. He is a youth product of Boavista, and was part of their U19 team that won the second division national trophy for that category in the 2021-22 season. He was named to their senior team for the 2022-23 season in the Primeira Liga. He made his professional debut as a substitute for Boavista as a substitute in the 90+6th minute in a 1–0 Primeira Liga win over Portimonense on 7 August 2022, and had a goal called off in his appearance.

References

External links
 

2004 births
Living people
Sportspeople from Bissau
Bissau-Guinean footballers
Boavista F.C. players
Primeira Liga players
Association football defenders
Bissau-Guinean expatriate footballers
Bissau-Guinean expatriates in Portugal
Expatriate footballers in Portugal